A by-election was held in the Tasmanian Legislative Council division of Pembroke on 1 August 2009. It was triggered by the resignation of sitting member Allison Ritchie.

Background

Ritchie was first elected to the Legislative Council in 2001 at the age of 26, the youngest person ever elected to that chamber. She spent nine and a half weeks as Minister for Planning and Workplace Relations in 2008, but resigned due to ill health. She announced her resignation from parliament amid allegations of nepotism on 20 June 2009.

Candidates

The writ for the by-election was issued on 30 June 2009; nominations closed on 9 July. The eight candidates were:

Independent — Honey Bacon, widow of former Tasmanian Premier Jim Bacon.
Independent — Peter Cooper, a Clarence City Alderman (2008–present).
Independent — James Crotty, former Labor candidate and considered the unofficial representative of the Government.
Liberal Party — Vanessa Goodwin, a 39-year-old lawyer and criminologist, was previously the Liberal candidate for the state seat of Franklin in 2006 and the federal candidate for the equivalent seat in 2007, achieving a rare swing to the Liberal Party.
Tasmanian Greens — Wendy Heatley, a 46-year-old lawyer.
Independent — Richard James, a Clarence City Alderman( 1984–89, 1994–present). James previously contested Pembroke in 1995, 1999 and 2007.
Independent — John Peers, a Clarence City Alderman (1994–present).
Independent — Kit (Sharon) Soo, a public relations consultant.

Results

Distribution of preferences

The distribution of preferences is shown in detail on the Tasmanian Electoral Commission website. In accordance with the preferential voting system, the following candidates were excluded in the order shown and their votes distributed to remaining candidates or declared exhausted (no more preferences): Soo, Cooper, Crotty, Peers, Bacon.

Vanessa Goodwin attained a quota (an absolute majority of formal votes) when two other candidates were left in the count, meaning that no two-candidate-preferred figure was attained.

References

External links
Pembroke 2009 by-election candidates: ABC elections
Pembroke 2009 by-election results: ABC elections
Pembroke 2009 by-election commentary: ABC elections
Tasmanian Electoral Commission Final Results - 11 Aug 2009

2009 elections in Australia
Tasmania state by-elections